The large moth subfamily Lymantriinae contains the following genera beginning with H:

References 

Lymantriinae
Lymantriid genera H